Butte Falls is a waterfall located near the town of Butte Falls in Jackson County, in the U.S. state of Oregon. In the past, the waterfall was the site of a water-driven sawmill that led to the town of Butte Falls.

See also
 Other waterfalls in Oregon with similar names:
 Butte Creek and its Butte Creek Falls
 Upper Butte Creek Falls

References

Waterfalls of Oregon
Parks in Jackson County, Oregon